Peter George Peterson (June 5, 1926 – March 20, 2018) was an American investment banker who served as United States Secretary of Commerce from February 29, 1972, to February 1, 1973, under the Richard Nixon administration. Before serving as Secretary of Commerce, Peterson was also chairman and CEO of Bell & Howell from 1963 to 1971. From 1973 to 1984 he was chairman and CEO of Lehman Brothers. Later in 1985, he co-founded the private equity firm The Blackstone Group, and served as chairman. In the same year, Peterson became chairman of the Council on Foreign Relations, a position he held until his retirement in 2007 after which he was named chairman emeritus. In 2008, Peterson was ranked 149th on the "Forbes 400 Richest Americans" with a net worth of $2.8 billion. He was also known as founder and principal funder of The Peter G. Peterson Foundation, which is dedicated to promoting fiscal austerity.

Early life
Peterson was born in Kearney, Nebraska, as the eldest of three children to Venetia "Venet" Paul (Pavlou- Παύλου) and George Peterson (Petropoulos- Πετρόπουλος), both were immigrants from southern Greece. He had one younger sister, Elaine, who died of croup when she was one year old and a brother, John, who was the youngest. His father arrived in the United States at the age of 17 and worked as a dishwasher for Union Pacific Railroad and roomed on a caboose. In 1923, George opened and then ran a Greek diner named Central Café in Kearney after changing his name from Georgios Petropoulos. Peter began working at the cash register at age 8. Transferring out of the Massachusetts Institute of Technology in his freshman year, Peterson later received an undergraduate degree from Northwestern University and The Kellogg School, graduating in 1947 with highest academic honors, summa cum laude. After college, Peterson was first married from 1948 to 1950 to Kris Krengel, a journalism student at Northwestern University. He joined Market Facts upon graduation, a Chicago-based market research firm, in 1948. In 1951, he received an M.B.A. degree from the University of Chicago Booth School of Business, before returning to Market Facts as an executive vice president.

Business career
Peterson joined advertising agency McCann Erickson in 1953, again in Chicago, where he served as a director. He joined movie-equipment maker Bell and Howell Corporation in 1958 as executive vice president. He later succeeded Charles H. Percy as chairman and CEO, positions he held from 1963 to 1971.

In 1969, he was invited by philanthropist John D. Rockefeller III, CFR Chairman John J. McCloy, and former Treasury Secretary Douglas Dillon to chair a Commission on Foundations and Private Philanthropy, which became known as the Peterson Commission. Among its recommendations adopted by the government were that foundations be required annually to disburse a minimum proportion of their funds.

United States Secretary of Commerce (1972–73)

In 1971, he was named assistant to the president for international economic affairs by U.S. President Richard Nixon. In April 1971, Peterson produced a secret report for Nixon on the volatile world economy and which argued the case that the United States was in economic decline under the existing world order of trade, which the U.S. had helped build immediately after World War II. To stem that decline, according to Peterson, the United States would have to challenge competing nations in the trading sphere by adopting industrial policy. The report impressed Nixon and the idea of American competitive decline soon became "an article of popular belief." The report established some of the intellectual foundations of Nixon's stunning decision in August 1971 to upend the Bretton Woods agreement. Professional economists derided the thesis as a form of mercantilism that betrayed "economic illiteracy."

In 1972, he became the Secretary of Commerce, a position he held for one year. At that time he also assumed the chairmanship of President Nixon's National Commission on Productivity and was appointed U.S. Chairman of the U.S.–Soviet Commercial Commission. During his tenure, Peterson was a strong critic of the rising financial debt of the United States.

Post-Washington career
Peterson was chairman and CEO of Lehman Brothers (1973–1977) and Lehman Brothers, Kuhn, Loeb Inc. (1977–1984).

In 1985, he co-founded with Stephen A. Schwarzman the prominent private equity and investment management firm, the Blackstone Group, and was for many years its chairman. At Blackstone, he made a fortune including the $1.9 billion he received when it went public in 2007, that funded many of his charitable and political causes.

Clinton presidency
In 1992, he was one of the co-founders of the Concord Coalition, a bipartisan citizens' organization that advocates reduction of the federal budget deficit. Following record deficits under President George W. Bush, Peterson commented in 2004, "I remain a Republican, but the Republicans have become a far more theological, faith-directed party, not troubling with evidence."

In February 1994, President Bill Clinton named Peterson as a member of the Bipartisan Commission on Entitlement and Tax Reform co-chaired by Senators Bob Kerrey and John Danforth. He also served as co-chair of the Conference Board Commission on Public Trust and Private Enterprises (Co-Chaired by John Snow).

Later career
Peterson succeeded David Rockefeller as chairman of the Council on Foreign Relations in 1985 and served until his retirement from that position in 2007. He served as trustee of the Rockefeller family's Japan Society and of the Museum of Modern Art, and was previously on the board of Rockefeller Center Properties, Inc.

He was the founding chairman of the Peterson Institute for International Economics (formerly the "Institute for International Economics", renamed in his honor in 2006), and a trustee of the Committee for Economic Development. He was also chairman of the Federal Reserve Bank of New York between 2000 and 2004.

In 2008, he founded the Peter G. Peterson Foundation (PGPF), an organization devoted to spreading public awareness on fiscal sustainability issues related to the national debt, federal deficits, Social Security policy, and tax policies. PGPF distributed the 2008 documentary film I.O.U.S.A., and did outreach to the 2008 presidential candidates.

Peterson funded The Fiscal Times, a news website that reports on current economic issues, including the federal budget, the deficit, entitlements, health care, personal savings, taxation, and the global economy. Fiscal Times contributors and editors include several veteran economics reporters for The New York Times and The Washington Post.

On August 4, 2010, it was announced that he had signed "The Giving Pledge."  He was one of 40 billionaires, led by Bill Gates and Warren Buffett, who agreed to give at least half their wealth to charity. Most of his giving was to his own foundation, The Peter G. Peterson Foundation, which focuses on raising public awareness about long-term fiscal sustainability issues.

Political activities
From 2007 through 2011, Peterson was reported to have contributed $458 million to the Peter G. Peterson Foundation, to promote the cause of fiscal responsibility.

Peterson opposed the Republican 2017 tax reforms, because they would cut corporate and other taxes by raising the debt. "Mortgaging our fiscal future for trillions in temporary tax cuts will hurt our economy over time, and every C.E.O. should know that," he said. "True business patriots need to advocate for their country as well as their company."

Personal life
He was married three times and divorced twice. In 1953, he married former Brown University psychology professor Sally Hornbogen Peterson, a trustee of the Dalton School and a graduate of Northwestern University, with whom he had four sons: John Scott Peterson, James Jim Peterson, David Peterson and Michael Alexander Peterson; and one daughter, the writer Holly Peterson. They divorced in 1979. The following year, Peterson married Joan Ganz Cooney, the co-creator of the popular American educational children's television series Sesame Street.

In his autobiography he recalled his business and private life in which he blamed himself for the failure of two of his three marriages but expressed pride for having grown close to his children.

Peterson died on March 20, 2018, of natural causes at his Manhattan apartment home at the age of 91. He is survived by his children, his wife Joan, and nine grandchildren.

Honors
In 1962, Peterson received the Golden Plate Award of the American Academy of Achievement.

In recognition of his support, the influential Peterson Institute for International Economics was named in his honor in 2006.

In 2006, Peterson was honored with the Woodrow Wilson Award for Corporate Citizenship by the Woodrow Wilson International Center for Scholars of the Smithsonian Institution. The same year he was elected as a fellow of the American Academy of Arts and Sciences.

Writings
 "Why I’m Giving Away $1 Billion", Newsweek, May 30, 2009
 "You Can't Take It with You", Newsweek, April 7, 2008
 "Old habits must change", The Banker, 3 January 2005
 Articles published in "Foreign Affairs" 1994–2004.

Books
 Facing Up: How to Rescue the Economy from Crushing Debt and Restore the American Dream. Simon & Schuster; First Edition (November 8, 1993). 
 Will America Grow up Before it Grows Old: How the Coming Social Security Crisis Threatens You, Your Family and Your Country. Random House; 1 edition (October 8, 1996). 
 Gray Dawn: How the Coming Age Wave Will Transform America—and the World. Three Rivers Press (September 26, 2000). 
 On Borrowed Time: How the Growth in Entitlement Spending Threatens America's Future with  Neil Howe. Transaction Publishers (May 1, 2004). 
 Running on Empty: How the Democratic and Republican Parties Are Bankrupting Our Future and What Americans Can Do About It. Picador (June 16, 2005). 
 The Education of an American Dreamer: How a Son of Greek Immigrants Learned His Way from a Nebraska Diner to Washington, Wall Street, and Beyond. Twelve (June 8, 2009).

References

External links 
 Biography from Blackstone Group
 The Concord Coalition biography
 Brandt 21 Forum biography
 
 
 
 
 Audio-Interview with Peter Peterson by German Journalist Wolfgang Blau, a.k.a. Harrer, Deutsche Welle, November 2004 (English interview with short German intro)
 Pete Peterson on Charlie Rose (PBS), 1994–2009.
 A Conversation with Peter Peterson at charlierose.com
 I.O.U.S.A.: The Movie a Peter G. Peterson Foundation-supported documentary
 
 
 Krugman's views on Peterson's efforts with the national debt
 

1926 births
2018 deaths
American bankers
American billionaires
American chairpersons of corporations
American chief executives of financial services companies
American chief executives of manufacturing companies
American financial company founders
American people of Greek descent
The Blackstone Group people
Giving Pledgers
21st-century philanthropists
Illinois Republicans
Lehman Brothers people
Nixon administration cabinet members
20th-century American politicians
Northwestern University alumni
People from Kearney, Nebraska
Private equity and venture capital investors
United States Secretaries of Commerce
University of Chicago Booth School of Business alumni
Nebraska politicians
Writers from Nebraska
Writers from New York City
Chairs of the Council on Foreign Relations 
People from Vero Beach, Florida